is a Japanese actress and a former gravure idol.

Career
Igawa appeared in Kiyoshi Kurosawa's 2008 film Tokyo Sonata and Shinji Aoyama's 2011 film Tokyo Park.

Filmography

Film
 Filament (2001)
 Tokyo.sora (2001)
 Dog Star (2002)
 Mokka no Koibito (2002)
 Ki no Umi (2004)
 69 (2004)
 Until the Lights Come Back (2005)
 Oh! Oku (2006)
 Waiting in the Dark (2006)
 Mizuchi (2006)
 Zo no Senaka (2007)
 The Investigation Game (2007)
 Ikigami (2008)
 Team Batista no Eiko (2008)
 Tokyo Sonata (2008)
 A Good Husband (2009)
 Dear Doctor (2009)
 Tokyo Park (2011)
 The Fish Tale (2022), Michiko

Television
 Psycho Doctor (2002)
 Sora Kara Furu Ichioku no Hoshi (2002)
 Shiritsu Tantei Hama Mike (2002)
 Yo nimo Kimyo na Monogatari (2003)
 Kougen e Irasshai (2003)
 Boku no Mahou Tsukai (2003)
 Hikari to Tomo ni (2004)
 Kikutei Yaozen no Hitobito (2004)
 Ranpo R Hakuhatsu Ki (2004)
 Ryoma ga Yuku (2004)
 Ruri no Shima (2005)
 Busu no Hitomi ni Koishiteru (2006)
 Woman's Island (2006)
 Junjo Kirari (2006)
 Shinuka to Omotta (2007)
 Kodoku no Kake (2007)
 Tengoku no Soup (2008)
 Room of King (2008)
 Freeter, Ie wo Kau (2010)
 Sunao ni Narenakute (2010)
 Kurumi no Heya (2011)
 Good Life: Arigato Papa Sayonara (2011)
 Hana Moyu (2015)
 The Sniffer (2016)
 Kizoku Tantei (2017)
 My High School Business (2017)
 Hanbun, Aoi (2018)
 Hanzawa Naoki (2020)
 Ochoyan (2020–21), Yuriko Takashiro
 Lost Man Found'' (2022), herself

Awards
 2001: 39th Golden Arrow Award - Graph Award
 2002: 40th Golden Arrow Award - Rookie of the Year

References

External links
 
 

1976 births
Living people
Japanese television actresses
Japanese film actresses
Actresses from Tokyo
21st-century Japanese actresses
South Korean expatriates in Japan
Zainichi Korean people